Joshua R. Smith (born 1968) is an American computer scientist and electrical engineer and a professor at the University of Washington (UW). He is known for research on wireless power (including WREL), backscatter communication (including WISP and Ambient Backscatter), and robotic manipulation.

Education and academic career 
He received a PhD degree from MIT in 1999, SM from MIT in 1995, MA from Cambridge University in Physics in 1997, and a dual BA in Computer Science and Philosophy from Williams College in 1991. He was at Intel Labs Seattle from 2004 to 2010, and joined the faculty of the University of Washington in 2011. He is the Milton and Delia Zeutschel Professor in Entrepreneurial Excellence at the University of Washington and leads the UW Sensor Systems Lab and directs the UW-Amazon Science Hub.

He is a Fellow of the Institute of Electrical and Electronics Engineers, recognized for "contributions to far‐ and near‐field wireless power, backscatter communication, and electric field sensing"; a Fellow of the National Academy of Inventors; and a 2013 Allen Distinguished Investigator.

Entrepreneurship and commercial applications 
Several startup companies are commercializing technology from his lab, under license from the University of Washington: Wibotic, eLoupes (as Proprio) Jeeva, and Corisma. His PhD research at MIT was commercialized  to make a smart airbag system.

References

External links
 Faculty website

American computer scientists
American electrical engineers
Fellow Members of the IEEE
University of Washington faculty
Massachusetts Institute of Technology alumni
Alumni of the University of Cambridge
Williams College alumni

1968 births
Living people